Metzneria is a genus of moths in the family Gelechiidae, described by Philipp Christoph Zeller in 1839.

Species
Metzneria acrena (Meyrick, 1908)
Metzneria aestivella (Zeller, 1839)
Metzneria agraphella (Ragonot, 1895)
Metzneria albiramosella (Christoph, 1885)
Metzneria aprilella (Herrich-Schaffer, 1854)
Metzneria artificella (Herrich-Schaffer, 1861)
Metzneria asiatica Piskunov, 1979
Metzneria aspretella Lederer, 1869
Metzneria brandbergi Janse, 1963
Metzneria campicolella (Mann, 1857)
Metzneria canella Caradja, 1920
Metzneria castiliella (Moschler, 1866)
Metzneria clitella Rebel, 1903
Metzneria diamondi Amsel, 1949
Metzneria diffusella Englert, 1974
Metzneria ehikeella Gozmany, 1954
Metzneria englerti Piskunov, 1979
Metzneria expositoi Vives, 2001
Metzneria filia Piskunov, 1979
Metzneria hastella Chrétien, 1915
Metzneria heptacentra Meyrick, 1911
Metzneria hilarella Caradja, 1920
Metzneria inflammatella (Christoph, 1882)
Metzneria intestinella (Mann, 1864)
Metzneria ivannikovi Piskunov, 1979
Metzneria kerzhneri Piskunov, 1979
Metzneria lacrimosa (Meyrick, 1913)
Metzneria lappella (Linnaeus, 1758) – burdock seedhead moth
Metzneria lepigrei Lucas, 1935
Metzneria littorella (Douglas, 1850)
Metzneria mendica Piskunov, 1979
Metzneria metzneriella (Stainton, 1851)
Metzneria montana Piskunov, 1979
Metzneria neuropterella (Zeller, 1839)
Metzneria paucipunctella (Zeller, 1839)
Metzneria portieri Viette, 1948
Metzneria riadella Englert, 1974
Metzneria sanguinea Meyrick, 1934
Metzneria santolinella (Amsel, 1936)
Metzneria staehelinella Englert, 1974
Metzneria strictella Turati, 1924
Metzneria subflavella Englert, 1974
Metzneria talassica Piskunov, 1979
Metzneria tenuiella (Mann, 1864)
Metzneria torosulella (Rebel, 1893)
Metzneria tristella Rebel, 1901
Metzneria varennei Nel, 1997

Former species
Metzneria torridella

References

 , 2007, Esperiana Buchreihe zur Entomologie Memoir 4: 91-116.
 , 2010: The gelechiid fauna of the southern Ural Mountains, part I: descriptions of seventeen new species (Lepidoptera: Gelechiidae). Zootaxa 2366: 1-34. Abstract: http://www.mapress.com/zootaxa/2010/f/z02366p034f.pdf].
 ; ;  2009: Checklist of Gelechiidae (Lepidoptera) in America North of Mexico. Zootaxa, 2231: 1-39. Abstract & excerpt
 , 2006, Synonymies et notes sur quelques Gelechiidae de la fauna de France (Lepidoptera), Bulletin de la Société entomologique de France 111 (1): 393-34.

 
Isophrictini